Newbern is a town in Dyer County, Tennessee. As of the 2010 census, the town population was 3,313.

History
In October 1902, Garfield Burley and Curtis Brown were lynched in downtown Newbern. Burley and Brown were tied together and hung from a telephone pole within sight of the town's train depot. The lynching is notable due to the efforts of several local community leaders to prevent it.

On April 2, 2006, sixteen people were killed in Newbern when it and its surrounding communities were directly hit by an F3 tornado. The storm caused nearly $15 million in damages.

Geography
Newbern is located at  (36.116460, -89.268099).

Climate
The climate in this area is characterized by hot, humid summers and generally mild to cool winters.  According to the Köppen Climate Classification system, Newbern has a humid subtropical climate, abbreviated "Cfa" on climate maps.

Demographics

2020 census

As of the 2020 United States Census, there were 3,349 people, 1,252 households, and 762 families residing in the town.

2000 census
As of the census of 2000, there were 2,988 people, 1,202 households, and 854 families residing in the town. The population density was 241.4/km2

There were 1,202 households, out of which 35.9% had children under the age of 18 living with them, 50.5% were married couples living together, 17.1% had a female householder with no husband present, and 28.9% were non-families. 26.1% of all households were made up of individuals, and 10.9% had someone living alone who was 65 years of age or older. The average household size was 2.48 and the average family size was 2.97.

In the town, the population was spread out, with 27.7% under the age of 18, 9.2% from 18 to 24, 29.0% from 25 to 44, 21.7% from 45 to 64, and 12.4% who were 65 years of age or older. The median age was 34 years. For every 100 females, there were 84.0 males. For every 100 females age 18 and over, there were 78.9 males.

The median income for a household in the town was $28,262, and the median income for a family was $36,853. Males had a median income of $28,393 versus $19,750 for females. The per capita income for the town was $15,575. About 14.6% of families and 16.7% of the population were below the poverty line, including 23.0% of those under age 18 and 13.9% of those age 65 or over.

Rail transportation

The Newbern Depot houses a museum. The museum exhibits old photos, railroad tools, uniforms, schedules, and other memorabilia, along with model trains and artwork commemorating the town's railroading past. On February 2, 2011 a truck was hit by a train at the crossing west of the depot. The semi landed within ten feet of the depot but caused no building damage. No one was reported injured in this event and the train itself acquired little damage, stopping prior to blocking the crossing located to the west of the depot.

Every year, the town holds a celebration around the train depot called Depot Days.

Education
Dyer County High School
Tennessee College of Applied Technology

References

Towns in Dyer County, Tennessee
Towns in Tennessee
1857 establishments in Tennessee